The 3x3 basketball tournament at the 2022 Mediterranean Games in Oran took place from 30 June to 3 July 2022.

Medal summary

Participating nations

Men

Women

References

External links
Official site
Results book

Basketball
Basketball at the Mediterranean Games
2022 in 3x3 basketball
Mediterranean Games